Mikhail Kuklev (born August 24, 1982) is a Russian professional ice hockey defenceman. He currently plays with HC 07 Detva in the Slovak Extraliga.

Kuklev made his Kontinental Hockey League debut playing with Severstal Cherepovets during the inaugural 2008–09 KHL season.

References

External links

1982 births
Living people
HC 07 Detva players
HC CSK VVS Samara players
Krylya Sovetov Moscow players
Metallurg Novokuznetsk players
Russian ice hockey defencemen
Severstal Cherepovets players
Zauralie Kurgan players
Russian expatriate sportspeople in Slovakia
Expatriate ice hockey players in Slovakia
Russian expatriate ice hockey people